Cashel Man is a bog body from a bog near Cashel in County Laois, Ireland. He was found on 10 August 2011 by Bord na Móna employee Jason Phelan from Abbeyleix. The body was a young adult male, around 20–25, who had been intentionally covered with peat after death. The crouched figure was recovered after being damaged by a milling machine in 2011. The head and left arm were presumed destroyed by the peat harvester, until later recovered.

Radiocarbon dating places the man as having died around 2000 BC, making him one of the oldest bog bodies in Europe.

Position at discovery 
Cashel Man was found lying on his right side with his legs tightly flexed. The body was in the middle of the bog, oriented north-to-south with his head pointing south. There was not much other information available because the head, neck and left arm were all removed from the body by the peat harvester. Mandible, teeth, ribs, clavicle, vertebra, skin and hair were all recovered within the milled peat from the harvester.

Examination
Cashel Man had once lived in what was a flourishing community. The legs were found to be protruding from the skin of the corpse, in addition to being exceptionally well preserved. The remaining part of the body inside of the bag-like skin was not as well preserved. The stomach of the man had long since decomposed, which made analyzing his last meal impossible. The body parts that had been disturbed by the milling machine were later recovered, including part of the head, which had  closely cut hair. The body was later moved to the National Museum of Ireland for examination. The man was believed to have been buried with his arms holding his legs, his knees bent toward his chest.

Death
The man had a pre-mortem broken arm, caused by a strike with a sharp object. It could have also been a slightly blunter object, like a primitive axe. His back was broken in two places (believed to have happened after his death), and there was a cut on his back, possibly inflicted by the peat harvester.
The body was accompanied by wooden stakes, suggesting ritual sacrifice. The wound on the man's arm may have been a defensive wound. The man may have once been the king of his region, and was sacrificed due to poor harvests, as a king was believed to have been responsible for such things. Like Old Croghan Man and Clonycavan Man, he was buried near a hill that may have been used for kingship initiation.

Possibility of sacrifice 
It is a commonly stated theory that the death of Cashel Man was related to a ritualistic killing tied to a kingship or territorial expansion designation. While there is no outright evidence of this, there are a few key indicators of this possibility. A common finding among bog bodies is their proximity to known kingship inaugural sites, usually in a lower valley area under the hillside of where the king took on their position. The bodies of sacrificed kings were often placed within pools near the boundaries of their territories. The only well-understood indicator for these specific sacrifice traditions is the proximity of bodies to other significant events/areas, making this theory difficult to prove or disprove.[5]

Nobility sacrifice ritual in Ireland 
One of the largest indicators of the possibility of the Cashel Man having been the victim of being a sacrifice is the known history of nobility sacrifices. When a king within Ireland had particularly troublesome issues with things like a bad harvest, drought or sickness they were the ones within the community who were held responsible. When a king would be found to be at fault for enough hardships of their people they would be ritualistically killed in the process of the inauguration ceremony of the new King.

Preservation 
The body is one of the oldest preserved bog bodies in the world and is also the oldest known preserved body with the flesh still intact. Peat bogs can be one of the best natural forms of preservation of all organic materials, including human bodies and items. The process that protects the contents from decomposition is caused by an anaerobic function of the lower levels of peat bogs. Anaerobic means the composition is lacking in free oxygen; this combined with the naturally high acid levels from the slowly decomposed plant material is a perfect natural solution for preservation. The slightly higher acid concentration along with a low oxygen content is inhospitable to the bacteria and organisms that cause decomposition; this naturally tans (via the same process used in leathermaking) the skin of any human or animal that is buried within it. This leads to organic materials being well preserved for thousands of years and is how Cashel Man is able to have perfectly intact skin and hair.

References

Sources 
 
 

2011 archaeological discoveries
Bog bodies
Celtic archaeological sites
Prehistoric burials in Ireland